The 2016 Piala Sumbangsih was the 31st edition of the Piala Sumbangsih, an annual football match played between the winners of the previous season's Malaysia Super League and Malaysia Cup. The game was played between the Selangor FA, winners of the 2015 Malaysia Cup, and Johor Darul Ta'zim F.C., champions of the 2015 Malaysia Super League.

Match Details

Source:

Winners

References

Piala Sumbangsih seasons
2016 in Malaysian football